Herederos is a prime time Spanish television drama series produced by Cuarzo Producciones for Televisión Española that was broadcast on La 1 of Televisión Española from 2007 to 2009. It stars Concha Velasco as Carmen Orozco, the matriarch of the Orozcos, a rich and powerful family in the world of bullfighting troubled by betrayals, hierarchical struggles, machinations, mysteries and personal confrontations.

Cast and characters
 Concha Velasco as Carmen Orozco Argenta
  as Rafael García del Hierro
 Mar Regueras as Julia Orozco
 Ginés García Millán as Bernardo Sánchez
 Félix Gómez as Jacobo García Orozco
  as Verónica García Orozco
  as Nino Moro Galán
 Petra Martínez as Teresa Galán
  as Cecilia Paniagua
  as Salvador Expósito
 Álvaro de Luna as Antonio Moro
 Cristina Castaño as Rocío Urquijo
 Irene Montalà as Mónica
 Asier Etxeandia as Gorka
  as Carlota
 Fabio Testi as Enrique Escarpa
 Lluís Homar as Luis Soler
 Julieta Serrano as psychiatrist
 Carme Elías as Manuela / Carmen Ruíz
 Nuria Gago as Lorena

Episodes

References 

Spanish television soap operas
La 1 (Spanish TV channel) network series
2007 Spanish television series debuts
2009 Spanish television series endings
2000s Spanish drama television series